The Balsas splitfin (Ilyodon whitei) is a species of fish in the family Goodeidae. It is endemic to Mexico where it occurs in the states of Morelos and Michoacán. This fish was formally described as Goodea whitei by Seth Eugene Meek in 1904 with the type locality given as Yautepec in Morelos. The specific name honours E. A. White of the Interoceanic Railway of Mexico for his interest in and support of Meek's work.

References

whitei
Freshwater fish of Mexico
Taxa named by Seth Eugene Meek
Fish described in 1904
Taxonomy articles created by Polbot